William Reid (6 November 1884 – 16 July 1965) was a Scottish Labour Party politician who served as Member of Parliament from 1950 to 1964.

After having served as a councillor for thirty years, he was first elected to the House of Commons for Glasgow Camlachie at the 1950 general election, ousting the sitting Conservative MP Charles Stuart McFarlane, who had been elected in a 1948 by-election. Reid was returned at the 1951 general election, but the constituency was abolished in 1955.

At the 1955 general election, he was returned for the new constituency of Glasgow Provan, where was re-elected three further times before his retirement at the 1964 general election.

References

For a biographical article on Reid see "The Last Covenanter" by Iain D. Patterson, New Ulster: Journal of the Ulster Society, No. 25: March 1995.

Some sources state that Reid was born in 1889 but this was not the case. His birth certificate can be found on the Scotland's People website Ref 644/2/1662 Camlachie, 1884.

External links 
 

1880s births
1965 deaths
Scottish Labour councillors
Scottish Labour MPs
Members of the Parliament of the United Kingdom for Glasgow constituencies
UK MPs 1950–1951
UK MPs 1951–1955
UK MPs 1955–1959
UK MPs 1959–1964